Maryville is a village in Madison County, Illinois, United States. The population was 8,221 at the 2020 census, up from 7,487 in 2010.

History
Coal mining was historically the principal industry in Maryville. Maryville was incorporated on July 21, 1902.

Geography
Maryville is located in southern Madison County at  (38.725298, -89.957674). It is bordered to the north by Glen Carbon, to the east by Troy, and to the south by Collinsville.

Illinois Route 159 passes through the village as Center Street, leading north  to Edwardsville, the Madison county seat, and south  to the center of Collinsville. Illinois Route 162 crosses the northern part of the village, leading east  to Troy and west  to Pontoon Beach. Interstates 55 and 70 cross the southern end of Maryville together, with access from Exit 15 (IL 159).

Demographics

As of the census of 2000, there were 4,651 people, 1,743 households, and 1,267 families living in the village. The racial makeup of the village was 94.11% White, 3.46% African American, 0.11% Native American, 0.49% Asian, 0.04% Pacific Islander, 0.77% from other races, and 1.01% from two or more races. Hispanic or Latino of any race were 2.00% of the population.

There were 1,743 households, out of which 35.6% had children under the age of 18 living with them, 61.8% were married couples living together, 8.8% had a female householder with no husband present, and 27.3% were non-families. 21.9% of all households were made up of individuals, and 5.5% had someone living alone who was 65 years of age or older. The average household size was 2.53 and the average family size was 2.99.

In the village, the age distribution of the population showed 24.9% under the age of 18, 7.2% from 18 to 24, 33.3% from 25 to 44, 21.7% from 45 to 64, and 12.9% who were 65 years of age or older. The median age was 36 years. For every 100 females, there were 90.9 males. For every 100 females age 18 and over, there were 87.0 males.

The median income for a household in the village was $60,135, and the median income for a family was $62,110. Males had a median income of $43,226 versus $30,393 for females. The per capita income for the village was $27,634. About 2.6% of families and 4.1% of the population were below the poverty line, including 2.0% of those under age 18 and 4.9% of those age 65 or over.

Notable people

 Michelle Bartsch-Hackley, Team USA Olympic volleyball member and professional volleyball player.
 Bob Boken, infielder for the Washington Senators and Chicago White Sox

Events
On March 8, 2009, 27-year-old Terry Sedlacek shot and killed Senior Pastor Fred Winters in front of the congregation at First Baptist Church of Maryville affiliated with the Southern Baptist Convention.

References

External links
 

Villages in Madison County, Illinois
Villages in Illinois